Henry MacDonald VC (28 May 1823 – 15 February 1893) was a Scottish recipient of the Victoria Cross, the highest and most prestigious award for gallantry in the face of the enemy that can be awarded to British and Commonwealth forces.

Details
MacDonald was 31 years old, and a colour sergeant in the Corps of Royal Engineers, British Army during the Crimean War when the following deed took place for which he was awarded the VC.

On 19 April 1855 at Sebastopol, Crimea, Colour-Sergeant MacDonald acted with great gallantry when engaged in effecting a lodgement in the enemy's rifle-pits in front of the left advance of the Right Attack. Subsequently, when the Engineer officers were badly wounded Colour-Sergeant MacDonald took command and he determinedly persisted in carrying on the sap notwithstanding the repeated attacks of the enemy.

Further information
He later achieved the rank of honorary captain.

The medal
This medal is now in the care of Glasgow Museums and is in open storage at the Glasgow Museums Resource Centre, 200 Woodhead Road, Glasgow.  These stores are open to the public with daily tours and the medal can be viewed on request.

References

Monuments to Courage (David Harvey, 1999)
The Register of the Victoria Cross (This England, 1997)
The Sapper VCs (Gerald Napier, 1998)
Scotland's Forgotten Valour (Graham Ross, 1995)

External links
Royal Engineers Museum Sappers VCs
Location of grave and VC medal (Glasgow)
Glasgow Museums Resource Centre

1823 births
1893 deaths
Military personnel from Inverness
British Army personnel of the Crimean War
Crimean War recipients of the Victoria Cross
British recipients of the Victoria Cross
Royal Engineers soldiers
Royal Engineers officers
Recipients of the Distinguished Conduct Medal
Chevaliers of the Légion d'honneur
British Army recipients of the Victoria Cross